San Colombano Belmonte is a comune (municipality) in the Metropolitan City of Turin in the Italian region Piedmont, located about  north of Turin.

San Colombano Belmonte borders the following municipalities: Cuorgnè, Canischio, and Prascorsano.

References

Cities and towns in Piedmont